The 1970 Mr. Olympia contest was an IFBB professional bodybuilding competition held in September  1970 at The Town Hall in New York City, New York.  It was the 6th Mr. Olympia competition held.

Results

References

External links 
 Mr. Olympia

 1970
1970 in American sports
1970 in bodybuilding
Mr. Olympia